Wigan F.C. may refer to:

 Wigan Warriors, rugby league club originally named Wigan Football Club
 Wigan Athletic F.C., association football club